Roman Mathias "Lefty" Bertrand (February 28, 1909 – March 17, 2002) was a Major League Baseball pitcher. Bertrand played one game for the Philadelphia Phillies in 1936. On April 15, he pitched the final two innings of the Phillies' 12–4 loss to the Boston Bees at Shibe Park surrendering 2 earned runs while striking out 1.

References

External links 

1909 births
2002 deaths
Philadelphia Phillies players
Major League Baseball pitchers
Baseball players from Minnesota
People from The Dalles, Oregon
People from Brown County, Minnesota
Saint Mary's Cardinals baseball players